William Fitzgerald Langworthy, KC (25 December 1867 – 28 September 1951) was a Conservative member of the House of Commons of Canada.

Life
Born in Manchester, England, he received his education there before becoming a barrister and crown attorney.

He moved to Canada in 1880 and studied further at Port Arthur, Ontario. From 1905 to 1925 he was a Crown Attorney for the Thunder Bay district, and he received King's Counsel.

He was elected to Parliament at the Port Arthur—Thunder Bay riding in the 1925 general election. After completing one term, the 15th Canadian Parliament, Langworthy left federal politics and did not seek re-election in the 1926 vote.

References

External links
 

1867 births
1951 deaths
Canadian King's Counsel
English expatriates in Canada
Conservative Party of Canada (1867–1942) MPs
Members of the House of Commons of Canada from Ontario
Politicians from Manchester
Politicians from Thunder Bay